John Edgar Littleton Moore (born 5 September 1883 at Lewisport, Kentucky; died 26 January 1935 in Indianapolis, Indiana) was an ordained minister in the Methodist Episcopal Church and later the Church of the Nazarene, who served as president of the Central Nazarene College (1911–1918), the Eastern Nazarene College (1918–1919), and Olivet University (1919–1922). Converted in July 1904, he received his education at Kentucky State University and Asbury College (graduating from the latter in 1907), then did graduate work for a master's degree at Boston University while principal of the Pentecostal Collegiate Institute. He was also an evangelist and served on the General Board of Foreign Missions for the Church of the Nazarene.

Notes and references 

Presidents of Eastern Nazarene College
Presidents of Olivet Nazarene University
Presidents of defunct Nazarene universities and colleges
American Nazarene ministers
Asbury University alumni
Kentucky State University alumni
Boston University alumni
1935 deaths
1883 births
People from Hancock County, Kentucky